The Jacksonville Division is a railroad division operated by CSX Transportation in the U.S. states of Florida, Georgia, and Alabama. The Jacksonville Division has 36 subdivisions.

The subdivisions within the Jacksonville Division are as follows:
 Achan Subdivision
 Auburndale Subdivision
 Bainbridge Subdivision
 Bone Valley Subdivision
 Brewster Subdivision
 Brooker Subdivision
 Brooksville Subdivision
 Brunswick Subdivision
 Callahan Subdivision
 Carters Subdivision
 CH Subdivision
 Clearwater Subdivision
 Deerhaven Subdivision
 Dothan Subdivision
 Fernandina Subdivision
 Fitzgerald Subdivision
 Homestead Subdivision
 Jacksonville Terminal Subdivision
 Jesup Subdivision
 Kingsland Subdivision
 Lakeland Subdivision
 Miami Subdivision
 Nahunta Subdivision
 P&A Subdivision
 Palmetto Subdivision
 Plant City Subdivision
 Sanford Subdivision
 Savannah Subdivision
 Tallahassee Subdivision
 Tampa Terminal Subdivision
 Thomasville Subdivision
 Valrico Subdivision
 Vitis Subdivision
 West Coast Subdivision
 Wildwood Subdivision
 Yeoman Subdivision

See also
 List of CSX Transportation lines

References

CSX Transportation lines